Ahmad Aladdin Arslan  (died 17 November 2014) was a Jordanian military leader of Chechen descent. He attained the rank of Major General. He was the only officer to have received the Jordanian Order of Military Gallantry "Wisam al-Iqdam al-Askari" twice. He led the response to the 1976 terrorist attack on the Amman InterContinental Hotel.

Death and burial
Aladdin was en route to receive medical treatment in Germany when he died during the flight, aged 72. He was subsequently buried on 19 November 2014 in the Chechen Cemetery in the city of Zarqa. He was buried with military honours. His funeral was attended amongst others by Prince Hashim Al Hussein, Chairman of the Joint Chiefs of Staff Mashal Al Zaben, King Abdullah's advisor for tribal affairs Sharif Fawaz Bin Zaben and ministers and deputies.

See also
 Battle of Mirbat

References

External links
 Footage from the 1976 terrorist attack at the InterContinental Hotel

1940s births
2014 deaths
Jordanian generals
Chechen people
Orders, decorations, and medals of Jordan